Strindar Leif Björk (29 November 1907 – 9 June 2000) was a Swedish economist, author and translator. He was a member of Clarté. oj

Bibliography 
All publications are Swedish editions.

 Sparande och sparpropaganda: en studie utarbetad i anledning av Svenska sparbanksföreningens avdelnings för sparpropaganda 10-åriga verksamhet, 1936
 Svensk socialpolitik 1933–1937, 1937
 Det svenska samhället, 1939
 Om subjektivismen inom Stockholmsskolan, 1990

References 

1907 births
2000 deaths
Swedish economists
Swedish non-fiction writers
German–Swedish translators
Swedish translators
Translators from Spanish
Translators from French
Uppsala University alumni
Writers from Stockholm